Freeman Wood (July 1, 1896 – February 15, 1956) was an American character actor of the silent and sound film eras.

Biography
Born in 1896 in Denver, Colorado, Wood would appear in his first film in 1919, The Adventure Shop. Early in his career he would have larger roles, often as the rival love interest to the main character, but his roles would get smaller and smaller as time went on. By 1933 he was relegated to what amounted to as bit parts, with his character often being unnamed. Over his 25-year career he would appear in over 60 films, the last of which was in a small role in 1944's Once Upon a Time, starring Cary Grant, Janet Blair, and James Gleason.

Filmography

(Per AFI database)

An * denotes a featured or starring role

The Adventure Shop (1919) - 
Diane of Star Hollow (1921) - Dick Harrison
Made in Heaven (1921) - Davidge*
High Heels (1921) - Cortland Van Ness*
The Rage of Paris (1921) - Jimmy Allen
White Hands (1922) - Ralph Alden*
 The Frozen North (1922)-Husband
 Fashion Row (1923) - Eric Van Corland*
Divorce (1923) - Townsend Perry
Gossip (1923) - Robert Williamson*
Innocence (1923) - Don Hampton*
The Man Alone (1923) - George Perry*
Out of Luck (1923) - Cyril La Mount
Broken Hearts of Broadway (1923) - Frank Huntleigh
The Wild Party (1923) - Jack Cummings*
Butterfly (1924) - Cecil Atherton
The Female (1924) - Clon Biron*
The Gaiety Girl (1924) - Christopher "Kit" Kershaw*
 The Girl on the Stairs (1924) - Dick Wakefield*
 One Glorious Night (1924) - Chester James*
The Price She Paid (1924) - Stanley Baird
 The Dancers (1925) - Evan Caruthers
Hearts and Spurs (1925) - Oscar Estabrook*
 The Part Time Wife (1925) - DeWitt Courtney*
Raffles, the Amateur Cracksman (1925) - Bunny Manners
Scandal Proof (1925) - Monty Brandster*
Wings of Youth (1925) - Lucien Angoola*
Josselyn's Wife (1926) - Mr. Arthur*
The Lone Wolf Returns (1926) - Mallison*
Mannequin (1926) - Terry Allen*
The Prince of Broadway (1926) - Wade Turner*
A Social Celebrity (1926) - Gifford Jones
McFadden's Flats (1927) - Desmond Halloran
The Coward (1927) - Leigh Morlock*
Taxi! Taxi! (1927) - Jersey
The Garden of Eden (1928) - Musical director
Half a Bride (1928) - Jed Session*
The Legion of the Condemned (1928) - Richard De Witt
The Little Yellow House (1928) - Wells Harbison*
Scarlet Youth (1928) - (unknown)*
Chinatown Nights (1929) - Gerald
Why Bring That Up? (1929) - Powell
Ladies in Love (1930) - Ward Hampton*
Lilies of the Field (1930) - Lewis Conroy*
Only the Brave (1930) - Elizabeth's lover
The Swellhead (1930) - Clive Warren
Young Eagles (1930) - Lieutenant Mason
Kept Husbands (1931) - Mr. Post
Evenings for Sale (1932) - Von Zelling
Lady with a Past (1932) - Patterson
I Believed in You (1934) - Guest at party
Desirable (1934) - 
Fugitive Lady (1934) - 
Go into Your Dance (1935) - Head waiter
I Live My Life (1935) - Waterbury Jr.
Redheads on Parade (1935) - Salesman
Too Many Parents (1936) - Clinton's stepfather
Two-Fisted Gentleman (1936) - 
Wells Fargo (1937) - 
Danger – Love at Work (1937) - Jones
The House Across the Bay (1940) - Mr. Hanson
She Knew All the Answers (1941) - 
Once Upon a Time (1944) -

References

External links

 
 
 

20th-century American male actors
American male silent film actors
1896 births
1956 deaths
American male film actors
Male actors from Denver